Sihui Station is a station on Line 1 and the  of the Beijing Subway. It is located in Sihui, Chaoyang District, Beijing.

This station was once called Bawangfen during planning.

Station layout 
The line 1 and Ba Tong line have island platforms that are on street level, parallel to each other. From August 29, 2021, only the Line 1 platform is used.

Exits 
There are two exits, lettered A and B. Exit A is accessible.

Gallery

References

Beijing Subway stations in Chaoyang District
Railway stations in China opened in 1999